Justice Vikramajit Sen (born 31 December 1950) is an Indian Judge, who has served as a  sitting judge of the Supreme Court of India from 2015 to 2015. He has also served as the Chief Justice of the Karnataka High Court from 2011 to 2012. From May 2019 to May 2022, he served as the chairman of the Bombay Stock Exchange.

Education
Sen was born into a Bengali Baidya Brahmin family. Sen pursued law from the prestigious Campus Law Centre of the Faculty of Law, University of Delhi. He graduated in History from St. Stephen's College, Delhi.

Career

On 7 July 1999, Sen was appointed an additional judge of the Delhi High Court and on 30 October 2000, he was appointed a permanent judge. On 12 September 2011 he was transferred to Karnataka High Court as an acting  Chief Justice and subsequently on 24 December 2011, he assumed office as Chief Justice of the Karnataka High Court. On 24 December 2012, he was elevated and appointed a judge at the Supreme Court of India.

He is also the chairman of the three-member panel to investigate sexual harassment charges against S K Gangele, a sitting judge of the Madhya Pradesh High Court.

From May 2019 to May 2022, for a terms of 3 years, he served as the chairman of the Bombay Stock Exchange. On 18 May 2022, he was succeeded by former RBI Deputy Governor S. S. Mundra.

References

1950 births
Living people
Justices of the Supreme Court of India
Judges of the Delhi High Court
Judges of the Karnataka High Court
Chief Justices of the Karnataka High Court
20th-century Indian judges
21st-century Indian judges
Bombay Stock Exchange